Mifa (also transliterated as Mifah or Al-Mifa), is a village in the sub-governorate of Bariq in  the province of Asir, Saudi Arabia. Mifa was the capital of  Jabali tribe, and was a most important market  (held on Saturday) of the neighbourhood it was the base of the sheikhdom of the Al-Jabali tribe and their metropolis. It also had a military point, which was an Ottoman infantry company, a special office for the telegraph, and a bustling market that was held every Saturday of every week. In our days, honor has preceded it in all respects. Many of Al-Mayfa’s houses are dilapidated, especially in the western neighborhood, and the village’s decline dates back to a century ago due to the Ikhwan’s attack on it in 1341 AH. And the ruined houses amount to about a third of their houses. In the west of the village, on the side of the century, there are ruins of a large ruined castle. Its owners are not known..

See also 
Bareq
 List of cities and towns in Saudi Arabia
 Regions of Saudi Arabia

References 

Populated places in Bareq
Populated places in 'Asir Province
Populated coastal places in Saudi Arabia